Esteban Guerrieri (born 19 January 1985 in Buenos Aires) is an Argentine racing driver set to compete in the 2023 FIA World Endurance Championship for Vanwall Racing Team. He was runner-up in Indy Lights in 2011 and 2012, and in the WTCR series, he was the most successful driver in terms of race wins and was overall runner-up in 2019.

Early career

Formula racing 
After graduating from karts, Guerrieri competed in various Formula Renault 2000 championships from 2001 to 2003. He won the Formula Renault 2000 Masters series in 2003, with 124 points and three wins from eight races in total.

For 2004, he took the large step up to Formula 3000, driving for BCN Competición. He performed well in his début year, finishing tied on 28 points in seventh place with compatriot and fellow rookie José María López. His best result came at the Hockenheim round of the season, where he finished in third place.

Despite this impressive showing, Guerrieri was unable to get a drive when F3000 changed into the GP2 Series for 2005, and spent that year and 2006 in the Formula 3 Euro Series, both seasons with Manor Motorsport. He finished fourth in the standings, with 58 points, two wins and two pole positions.

He competed in British Formula 3 for 2007 with Ultimate Motorsport Team finishing thirteenth overall in the final standings. Returning for 2008, he achieved the best result for him and his team with a second place on Monza, the third race of the year. After that race, he moved to the Formula Renault 3.5 Series. He took his first FR3.5 win in the final race of the season. He did however return to F3 at the Bucharest meeting taking a pair of fourth positions.

In 2009, Guerrieri drove for various teams in the Superleague Formula series, winning two races in the process. For 2010 he has returned to Formula Renault 3.5 full-time, although budgetary concerns have caused him to miss races.

In August 2010, Guerrieri revealed that he has a priority contract with the Virgin Racing Formula One team for a  race seat, providing that he can raise $8 million. Guerrieri's manager has held discussions with the Argentine Interior Minister on the subject of possible government funding. The Argentine government has previously provided financial support to compatriot José María López's attempts to enter Formula One.

For 2011, Guerrieri went to the United States with the ultimate goal of racing in the IndyCar Series, starting with Indy Lights. During the 2011 Indy Lights season, Guerrieri drove for Sam Schmidt Motorsports. He finished the season runner-up to teammate Josef Newgarden with three wins. In 2012, he again finished second in the championship behind his teammate Tristan Vautier, taking three wins, including the Indianapolis 500 support race. Due to budget constraints, he moved back to Argentina for 2013.

Touring car career

Argentina 
In 2013, Guerrieri switched to the Argentinian touring car series Turismo Carretera to drive a Dodge for Oil Competición. He also raced in Top Race V6 for Midas Racing Team.

Having previously raced as a guest driver in various TC 2000 races between 2009 and 2011, winning the 200 km de Buenos Aires in 2011, Guerrieri joined the Toyota team for the 2014 Súper TC 2000 season. He finished 16th in the 2014 drivers' standings, before finishing eighth in 2015 with a single win, and then seventh with another victory in 2016. Guerrieri moved from Toyota to Citroën for the 2017 season, resulting 11th in the championship with one win.

World Touring Cars 

In August 2016, he got a chance from Campos Racing to compete in the Argentinian round of the World Touring Car Championship with a Chevrolet Cruze TC1 car. Guerrieri was successful on his first appearance as he finished the main race in sixth and scored the fastest lap of all during the weekend.

For the 2017 season, Guerrieri became a full-time driver at Campos Racing, driving the team's only car. During the first seven rounds, he won the opening races in Marrakech and China. With three rounds remaining in the season, the Honda factory squad signed him to replace the injured Tiago Monteiro. He then took pole position and main race victory in the final round at Qatar, ending up fourth in the drivers' standings.

After the series became the World Touring Car Cup in 2018, Guerrieri remained at Honda, now with Münnich Motorsport running the cars. In 2018 he won at Nürburgring and Macau to place third in the standings. For the following season, he took four wins to finish as championship runner-up; he was recognised by TouringCarTimes as the best driver of the WTCR season. Guerrieri won four times again in 2020, breaking the record for most wins in WTCR, and finished fourth in the drivers' cup. He scored five podiums, although no wins, across the 2021 and 2022 seasons, finishing them sixth and eighth overall respectively. No driver managed to match or surpass Guerrieri's tally of 10 wins, and as the WTCR ended after 2022, Guerrieri became the series' most successful driver in terms of victories.

Hypercar career
For 2023, Guerrieri would move to the Floyd Vanwall Racing Team in the World Endurance Championship, driving a Vanwall Vandervell 680 alongside Tom Dillmann and Jacques Villeneuve.

Racing record

Career summary

† – Team standings.
* Season still in progress.

‡ As he was a guest driver, Guerrieri was ineligible to score points.

Complete International Formula 3000 results
(key) (Races in bold indicate pole position; races in italics indicate fastest lap.)

Complete Formula 3 Euro Series results
(key) (Races in bold indicate pole position) (Races in italics indicate fastest lap)

† As Guerrieri was a guest driver, he was ineligible for championship points.

Complete Formula Renault 3.5 Series results
(key) (Races in bold indicate pole position) (Races in italics indicate fastest lap)

Superleague Formula

Super Final Results

2010
(key) (Races in bold indicate pole position) (Races in italics indicate fastest lap)

American open–wheel racing results
(key)

Indy Lights

Complete World Touring Car Championship results
(key) (Races in bold indicate pole position) (Races in italics indicate fastest lap)

‡ Half points awarded as less than 75% of race distance was completed.

Complete World Touring Car Cup results
(key) (Races in bold indicate pole position) (Races in italics indicate fastest lap)

† Driver did not finish the race, but was classified as he completed over 90% of the race distance.

Complete Stock Car Brasil results

24 Hours of Nürburgring results

Complete FIA World Endurance Championship results
(key) (Races in bold indicate pole position; races in italics indicate fastest lap)

* Season still in progress.

References

External links

 Official website
 Career statistics from Driver Database

1985 births
Living people
Racing drivers from Buenos Aires
Argentine racing drivers
Formula Renault Argentina drivers
Olympiacos CFP (Superleague Formula team) drivers
German Formula Renault 2.0 drivers
Italian Formula Renault 2.0 drivers
Formula Renault Eurocup drivers
Formula Renault V6 Eurocup drivers
Formula 3 Euro Series drivers
British Formula Three Championship drivers
International Formula 3000 drivers
TC 2000 Championship drivers
Superleague Formula drivers
World Series Formula V8 3.5 drivers
Indy Lights drivers
World Touring Car Championship drivers
International GT Open drivers
World Touring Car Cup drivers
Manor Motorsport drivers
Jenzer Motorsport drivers
Cram Competition drivers
Fortec Motorsport drivers
Signature Team drivers
RC Motorsport drivers
ISR Racing drivers
Charouz Racing System drivers
Campos Racing drivers
Súper TC 2000 drivers
Arrow McLaren SP drivers
Nürburgring 24 Hours drivers
Kolles Racing drivers
FIA World Endurance Championship drivers